Albert Leung (born 7 December 1961) is a Hong Kong lyricist and writer.

Education
Leung attended all-boy secondary schools in Kowloon at Chan Sui Ki (La Salle) College and La Salle College. He received a bachelor of arts with a major in translation studies from the University of Hong Kong in 1984.

Songwriting career
He has been a Cantopop lyricist since 1985, using the pen name Lam Chik. The Chinese characters for this name, 林夕, written vertically, look like the compound (simplified) character  (jyutping: mung6, pinyin: mèng), meaning "dream".

He has written over 3500 song lyrics. He is well known for composing lyrics very quickly. On TVB's show Be My Guest, he admitted that his fastest record for writing the complete lyrics to a song is 45 minutes.

His most noted songwriting partnership is with composer Zhang Yadong for Faye Wong, but he has also written with Leslie Cheung, Andy Lau, Miriam Yeung and many others.
 
He composed the lyrics to the song "Beijing Welcomes You", a six-minute song which was performed for the 2008 Beijing Olympics by a panoply of popular Chinese singers, and which proved extremely popular with the Chinese public.

In May 2009 he published a book about his creative work in the previous decade, 曾經—林夕90前後 ('Once–Lin Xi's 1990s from beginning to end').

In November 2019, over thousands of songs written by Leung were reportedly taken down from online music stores in China after voicing support for the 2019–20 Hong Kong protests, after collaborating with Taiwanese band Fire EX. to write a song in support of the protests.

References

1961 births
Alumni of the University of Hong Kong
Alumni of St. John's College, University of Hong Kong
Cantopop artists
Faye Wong
Hong Kong Buddhists
Hong Kong lyricists
Living people